Comet is an American digital broadcast television network owned by the Sinclair Television Group subsidiary of Sinclair Broadcast Group and operated by the MGM Television division of Metro-Goldwyn-Mayer, which focuses on science fiction and supernatural programming.

The following is a list of affiliates for the network categorized by state and arranged by market, and includes other information (including the subchannel allocated to carry the network and its date of affiliation). A section listing former affiliates will eventually be added in the event that a charter outlet (or any affiliates that did not sign agreements to carry the network before it launched) disaffiliates from Comet outright or moves its channel placement, which will note the years in which a station was affiliated with the network and the current affiliation status of the former Comet-affiliated subchannel.

As of March 1, 2017, Sinclair has made the network's live stream available as an app on the Apple TV and Roku digital media player platforms (and in 2019 Sinclair's Stirr service also carries the network), allowing viewers without an over-the-air affiliate to view Comet's programming.

Stations listed in BOLD are Comet owned-and-operated.

Current affiliates

Former affiliates

References 

Comet